Craig Hayes is a special effects artist.

Craig Hayes may also refer to:

Craig Hayes (actor), see Solo Trans
Craig Hayes-film editor, see Leonie (film)